Alan Chandronnait (born July 31, 1957) is an American former professional tennis player.

Chandronnait is a native of Hudson, New Hampshire, and was a three-time NHIAA singles champion at Alvirne High School. He featured in either the singles or doubles main draw in five editions of the Volvo International, a Grand Prix tournament held in his home state. In 2006 he was inducted into the New England Tennis Hall of Fame.

References

External links
 
 

1957 births
Living people
American male tennis players
Tennis people from New Hampshire
People from Hudson, New Hampshire